Arctostaphylos pumila, with the common name sandmat manzanita, is a species of manzanita.

Description
Arctostaphylos pumila is a petite, low-lying manzanita which forms flat bushes and patchy, creeping mats in sandy soil. The bark is reddish and tends not to shred. The leaves are small and mainly oval-shaped, dark green on the upper surface and grayish and fuzzy beneath. The flowers appear in sparse inflorescences and are white to very pale pink. The fruit is a round brownish drupe about half a centimeter wide.

Distribution
The Arctostaphylos pumila shrub is endemic to California where it grows on the coastline near Monterey and the Monterey Bay.

See also
California coastal sage and chaparral ecoregion

References

External links
Jepson Manual Treatment
USDA Plants Profile
Photo gallery

pumila
Endemic flora of California
Natural history of the California chaparral and woodlands
Natural history of Monterey County, California